Truthan House is a house near St Erme in Cornwall, England, UK. The house is 18th-century with some 19th-century alterations; it has a five-bay granite front with a Tuscan porch.

References

Houses in Cornwall